Art Technology Group (ATG) was an independent internet technology company specializing in eCommerce software and on-demand optimization applications until its acquisition by Oracle on January 5, 2011. ATG continues to be based in Cambridge, Massachusetts and operates under its own name as a subsidiary of Oracle. The company is a provider of eCommerce software and related on-demand commerce optimization applications. ATG's solutions  provide merchandising, marketing, content personalization, automated recommendations, and live-help services.

Corporate history, acquisitions

1991: ATG is cofounded by Jeet Singh and Joseph "Joe" Taisup Chung, both graduates of MIT.

1991-1996: ATG delivered consulting services for building Web sites

1997-1998: ATG transitioned to a software company offering several products including an Application Server and an e-commerce platform.

1999: ATG made its initial public offering.

2000-2003: Focused on commerce applications, business tools for content management, merchandising, marketing and analytics; shift to industry standard application servers from IBM, BEA and JBoss.

2004: ATG acquired Primus Knowledge Solutions in a disputed acquisition that closed on November 1, 2004.

2005: ATG completed the integration of the Primus applications onto the ATG Web marketing and ecommerce software platform

2006: ATG acquired eStara, a provider of click to call, chat and call tracking solutions.

2008: ATG acquired privately held CleverSet; the transaction closed on February 6, 2008.

2010: ATG acquired privately held InstantService; the transaction closed on January 12, 2010.

2010: Oracle Corporation reaches an agreement with ATG to start the acquisition process of ATG into Oracle. The announcement of the acquisition agreement was made public on November 2, 2010.

2011: Oracle Corporation completes its acquisition of ATG on January 5, 2011 for an estimated $1 billion, or $6.00 a share.

See also 

 Oracle Advertising and Customer Experience (CX)

References

External links
 The official ATG User Group
 ATG Web Commerce Development
 ATG Group on LinkedIn
 ATG

Software companies based in Massachusetts
Companies based in Cambridge, Massachusetts
Oracle acquisitions
Software companies established in 1991
1991 establishments in Massachusetts
Companies formerly listed on the Nasdaq
1999 initial public offerings
2011 mergers and acquisitions
Defunct software companies of the United States